Poa is a genus of about 570 species of grasses, native to the temperate regions of both hemispheres. Common names include meadow-grass (mainly in Europe and Asia), bluegrass (mainly in North America), tussock (some New Zealand species), and speargrass. Poa is Greek for "fodder". Poa are members of the subfamily Pooideae of the family Poaceae.

Bluegrass, which has green leaves, derives its name from the seed heads, which are blue when the plant is allowed to grow to its natural height of two to three feet (0.6 to 0.9 meters).

The genus Poa includes both annual and perennial species. Most are monoecious, but a few are dioecious (separate male and female plants). The leaves are narrow, folded or flat, sometimes bristled, and with the basal sheath flattened or sometimes thickened, with a blunt or hooded apex and membranaceous ligule.

Cultivation and uses
Many of the species are important pasture plants, used extensively by grazing livestock. Kentucky bluegrass (Poa pratensis) is the most extensively used cool-season grass used in lawns, sports fields, and golf courses in the United States. Annual bluegrass (Poa annua) can sometimes be considered a weed.

According to second-century physician Galen, the roots of certain species are good for treating fresh wounds and bleeding. In the sixteenth century, Poa grasses were used to treat inflammation of the kidney.

Some of the Poa species are popular for gardens and for landscaping in New Zealand.

Insect foodplant

Lepidoptera whose caterpillars feed on Poa include:
Agriphila inquinatella
Cercyonis pegala (common wood-nymph)
Poanes hobomok (Hobomok skipper)
Poanes zabulon (Zabulon skipper)

Selected species

References

 
Poaceae genera
Lawn grasses
Taxa named by Carl Linnaeus